Jaroslav Král (born 6 March 1948) is a Czechoslovak boxer. He competed in the men's light heavyweight event at the 1972 Summer Olympics. In his first fight, he lost to Janusz Gortat of Poland.

References

External links
 

1948 births
Living people
Light-heavyweight boxers
Czechoslovak male boxers
Olympic boxers of Czechoslovakia
Boxers at the 1972 Summer Olympics
Place of birth missing (living people)
Czech male boxers